Fred Dewitt (October 19, 1900 – June 11, 1962) was an American Negro league first baseman in the 1920s.

A native of Elkville, Illinois, Dewitt attended Wilberforce University. He played for the Kansas City Monarchs in 1927, and went on to play for the Cleveland Tigers the following season and the Memphis Red Sox in 1929. Dewitt died in Chicago, Illinois in 1962 at age 61.

References

External links
 and Seamheads

1900 births
1962 deaths
Cleveland Tigers (baseball) players
Kansas City Monarchs players
Memphis Red Sox players
Baseball first basemen
Baseball players from Illinois
People from Jackson County, Illinois
20th-century African-American sportspeople